In enzymology, a CDP-glycerol glycerophosphotransferase is an enzyme that catalyzes the chemical reaction

CDP-glycerol + (glycerophosphate)n  CMP + (glycerophosphate)n+1

Thus, the two substrates of this enzyme are CDP-glycerol and (glycerophosphate)n, whereas its two products are CMP and (glycerophosphate)n+1.

This enzyme belongs to the family of transferases, specifically those transferring non-standard substituted phosphate groups.  The systematic name of this enzyme class is CDP-glycerol:poly(glycerophosphate) glycerophosphotransferase. Other names in common use include teichoic-acid synthase, cytidine diphosphoglycerol glycerophosphotransferase, poly(glycerol phosphate) polymerase, teichoic acid glycerol transferase, glycerophosphate synthetase, and CGPTase.

References

 

EC 2.7.8
Enzymes of unknown structure